Cyrtodactylus kimberleyensis, also known as the Kimberley bent-toed gecko or East Montalivet Island gecko, is a species of gecko that is endemic to East Montalivet Island in Western Australia.

References 

Cyrtodactylus
Reptiles described in 2012